Souni–Zanatzia or Souni–Zanakia ( or  []) is a community consisting of two villages, Souni and Zanatzia, in the Limassol District of Cyprus. Souni is located 8 km north of Erimi.

References

Communities in Limassol District